Maackia raphidia is a species of freshwater snail with an operculum, an aquatic gastropod mollusk in the family Amnicolidae.

Distribution
Maackia raphidia lives in the Angara River. The type locality is “lac Baikal”, lake Baikal.

References

External links 

Amnicolidae
Gastropods described in 1860